Margaret Vale (born Margaret Smyth Flinn, later Margaret Howe; March 30, 1878 in Charleston, South Carolina – November 29, 1947 in Columbia, South Carolina) was a film and theatre actress and a feminist.

Career

Filmography
She appeared in two silent films.

Stage work
Vale appeared in one Broadway-theatre production, the comedy play Omar, the Tentmaker (1914), in New York City, New York.

Personal life
She was married to George Howe.

References

External links

Staff writer (October 20, 1914). "President's Niece, Insulted in Street, Has Man Arrested — Then Pleads in Court for Leniency for Flirt, But Dr. E.C. White Is Sent to Workhouse for Ten Days".  Evening Ledger-Philadelphia (archive hosted at the Library of Congress website). 
 photo (1913)

1878 births
1947 deaths
American silent film actresses
American stage actresses
American feminists
Actresses from New York City
Actresses from Charleston, South Carolina
20th-century American actresses